Kacper Kozłowski may refer to:

Kacper Kozłowski (sprinter) (born 1986), Polish sprint athlete
Kacper Kozłowski (footballer) (born 2003), Polish footballer